Ding Guangquan (14 October 1944 – 18 January 2018) was a Chinese comedian. He mainly performed Xiangsheng (crosstalk), a form of traditional Chinese comedy. He was a senior actor in the China Coal-Mine Art Troupe and had accepted over 40 students in his years teaching.

Many of Ding's foreign students are now stars of comic dialogue on the Chinese stage today, such as Mark Rowswell (Dashan), Julien Guadfroy, Jesse Appell (艾杰西), and Liam Bates (Li Mu).

Ding's master was the famous Xiangsheng master, Hou Baolin, whom he studied under starting in 1973.

References

1944 births
2018 deaths
20th-century Chinese male actors
21st-century Chinese male actors
Chinese male comedians
Deaths from lung cancer
Hui people
Chinese xiangsheng performers